The prehensile green tree skink (Prasinohaema prehensicauda) is a species of skink. It is found in Papua New Guinea.

Names
Green P. prehensicauda are called , while brown ones are called .

Habitat
It is an arboreal skink found in casuarinas and other second-growth trees.

References

Prasinohaema
Skinks of New Guinea
Endemic fauna of Papua New Guinea
Taxa named by Arthur Loveridge